Kumazawa (written: 熊沢 or 熊澤 lit. "bear swamp") is a Japanese surname. Notable people with the surname include:

, Japanese philosopher
, Japanese businessman
, Japanese industrialist
, Japanese footballer
, Japanese photographer

Japanese-language surnames